Mark B. Moss is an American neurobiologist currently the Waterhouse Professor at Boston University.

References

Year of birth missing (living people)
Living people
Boston University faculty
American neuroscientists
Harvard Medical School alumni